Peace to Him Who Enters is a 1961 Soviet drama film written and directed by Aleksandr Alov and Vladimir Naumov. Set in World War II, it tells the story of three Soviet soldiers who try to rescue a trapped pregnant German woman by taking her on a dangerous drive to a hospital.

Plot
Lieutenant Ivlev from the Red Army who has just graduated from school, arrives for duty in Berlin a few days before the surrender of Germany in World War II. In the city destroyed by conflict, the soldiers find a pregnant woman, a German. The commanders of their division decide to help her get to the hospital. Lieutenant Ivlev is charged to accompany the pregnant German woman to the rear, giving him a chauffeur and a shell-shocked soldier, who also need to be sent to the hospital. Thus, senior officers want to save the new lieutenant from possible destruction in Berlin at the end of the war.

As a result of the long and arduous journey, the protagonist has matured and become a completely different person. Along with the driver, a soldier of the American army he met along the way, they help the German woman, bringing her to a safe place. The war ends, marked by the birth of a baby in a new, peaceful world. The final shot is of a newborn infant urinating on a pile of now unnecessary, discarded weapons.

Cast
Viktor Avdyushko as Ivan Yamshchikov
Aleksandr Demyanenko as Shura Ivlev
Stanislav Khitrov as Pavel Vasilyevich Rukavitsyn
Lidiya Shaporenko as Barbara, German
Vera Bokadoro as French
Nikolai Grinko as American driver
Nikolai Timofeyev as battalion commander
Izolda Izvitskaya as Klava, traffic controller
Andrei Fajt as Serbian
Aleksandr Kuznetsov as Slava (uncredited)
Stepan Krylov as Lieutenant Colonel Chernyayev
Vladimir Marenkov as foreman
Erwin Knausmüller as German officer
Nikolai Khryashchikov as wounded man in Zwickau (uncredited)

Awards
The film received the Special Jury Prize for Best Director and the Pasinetti Award (prize of Italian critics for the best foreign film) at the 22nd Venice International Film Festival.

References

External links 

1961 drama films
1961 films
1960s Russian-language films
Films directed by Aleksandr Alov
Films directed by Vladimir Naumov
Venice Grand Jury Prize winners
Mosfilm films
Soviet black-and-white films
Soviet World War II films
Soviet drama films